Sairostoma is a genus of air-breathing land snails, terrestrial pulmonate gastropod mollusks in the family Streptaxidae.

Distribution 
The distribution of the genus Sairostoma includes:
 north-east Brazil

Description 
The anatomy of Sairostoma is currently unknown.

Species
Species within the genus Sairostoma include:
 Sairostoma perplexum Haas, 1938

References

Streptaxidae